Roxana ( – 310 BC, ; Old Iranian: *Raṷxšnā- "shining, radiant, brilliant"; sometimes Roxanne, Roxanna, Rukhsana, Roxandra and Roxane) was a Sogdian or a Bactrian princess whom Alexander the Great married after defeating Darius, ruler of the Achaemenid Empire, and invading Persia. The exact date of her birth is unknown, but she was probably in her early teens at the time of her wedding to Alexander the Great.

Biography 
Roxana was born in c. 340 BC as the daughter of a Bactrian nobleman named Oxyartes who served Bessus, the satrap of Bactria and Sogdia. He was thus probably also involved in the murder of the last Achaemenid king Darius III. After Bessus was captured by the Macedonian ruler Alexander the Great, Oxyartes and his family continued to resist the Macedonians, and along with other notables such as the Sogdian warlord Spitamenes, took up a defensive position in a fortress known as the Sogdian Rock.

They were eventually defeated by Alexander, who attended a celebration, and reportedly fell in love with Roxana on sight. Where the celebration took place, if in the Sogdian Rock or another fortress of Chorienes (also called  Sisimithres by Quintus Rufus Curtius) during which Alexander met Roxana is disputed but according to the Metz Epitome it was in the house of Chorienes in which Roxana was introduced to Alexander as the daughter of Oxyartes.  Curtius apparently misrepresented Roxana as a daughter of Chorienes and Arrian claims, Oxyartes surrendered to Alexander the Great when he became aware of the good reception Alexander awarded his daughter Roxana. A.B. Bosworth mentions the possibility of Roxana being captured at the Sogian Rock, but that the two married at the fortress of Chorienes. The marriage was in 327 BC, and according to the majority of the sources it was in Macedonian rite not the Persian. 

Alexander married Roxana despite opposition from his companions who would have preferred a Macedonian or a Greek Queen. But the marriage was also of political advantage as it made the Sogdian army more loyal towards Alexander and less rebellious after their defeat. Alexander thereafter made an expedition into India and while there he appointed Oxyartes as the governor of the Hindu Kush region adjoining India. It is assumed that during this period, Roxana was in a safe place in Susa. When Alexander returned to Susa, he promoted a brother of Roxana to the elite cavalry. With the aim of a better acceptance of his government among the Persians, Alexander also married Stateira II, the daughter of the deposed Persian King Darius III.

After Alexander's sudden death at Babylon in 323 BC, Roxana is believed to have murdered Alexander's other widow, Stateira II, and according to Plutarch also Stateira's sister, Drypetis with the consent of Perdiccas. Roxana's unborn child caused some discussions between Alexander's loyalists around Perdiccas and Ptolemy who suggested to await Alexander's child to be the next King and name either a caretaker regent or a council in his stead, and the Macedonian soldiers who opposed a so-called persianization of the Macedonian court. For the Macedonian succession a temporary compromise was found as Arrhidaeus was declared Macedonian King; if the unborn child was a son, he was to  become a King as well. By 317 though, Roxana's son, called Alexander IV lost his right to be king due to intrigues started by the Philip Arrhidaeus' wife, Eurydice II. Afterwards Roxana and her son were protected by Alexander's mother, Olympias, in Macedonia. Following Olympias' assassination in 316 BC Cassander imprisoned Roxana and Alexander IV in the citadel of Amphipolis. Their detention was condemned by the Macedonian general Antigonus in 315 BC. In 311 BC a peace treaty between Antigonus and Cassander confirmed the Kingship of Alexander IV but also Cassander as his guardian, following which the Macedonians demanded his release.  However, Cassander ordered Glaucias of Macedon to kill Alexander and Roxana. It is assumed that they were murdered in spring 310 BC, but their death was concealed until the summer. The two were killed after Heracles, a son of Alexander the Great's mistress Barsine, was murdered, bringing the Argead dynasty to an end.

Legacy

 Asteroid 317 Roxane is named in her honor.

 At the Acropolis, there were found inscriptions of offerings Roxana shall have dedicated as Alexander's wife to Athena.

 Lucian describes a painting of Roxanas marriage with Alexander by the Greek painter Echion (also known as Aetion) which won the painter the consent of the Olympic Hellanodike Proxenidas to marry his daughter.
 In one of the versions of the Alexander Romances, Darius III is her father and dying gives his consent to the marriage in which she wears the royal jewelry Alexander had asked for at his mother Olympias. The marriage takes then place in Darius palace.

See also
 Alexandre et Roxane, an opera that Mozart planned to write
 Balkh
 Roshanak

References

Sources

External links

 
 Roxane  by Jona Lendering
 Wiki Classical Dictionary: Roxane, daughter of Oxyartes
 Roxana from Charles Smith's Dictionary of Greek and Roman Biography and Mythology (1867)

340s BC births
310s BC deaths
4th-century BC Iranian people
4th-century BC women
Ancient Macedonian queens consort
Ancient murder victims
Bactria
Iranic women
Murdered royalty of Macedonia (ancient kingdom)
People who died under the regency of Cassander
Sogdian people
Wives of Alexander the Great
Women in Hellenistic warfare
Women of the Achaemenid Empire